Blissus sweeti is a species of true bug in the family Blissidae. It is found in Central America and North America.

References

Blissidae
Articles created by Qbugbot
Insects described in 1968